Sphecomyia vittata (Wiedemann, 1830), the Long-horned Yellowjacket, is an uncommon species of syrphid fly observed throughout North America, concentrated in the eastern half of the continent. Hoverflies can remain nearly motionless in flight. The adults are also known as flower flies for they are commonly found on flowers, from which they get both energy-giving nectar and protein-rich pollen. The larvae have been found in sap runs and tree wounds.

Distribution
Canada, United States.

References

Eristalinae
Insects described in 1830
Diptera of North America
Hoverflies of North America
Taxa named by Christian Rudolph Wilhelm Wiedemann